The Harappan language is the unknown language or languages of the Bronze Age Harappan civilization (Indus Valley civilization, or IVC). The language being unattested in any readable contemporary source, hypotheses regarding its nature are reduced to purported loanwords and substratum influence, notably the substratum in Vedic Sanskrit and a few terms recorded in Sumerian cuneiform (such as Meluhha), in conjunction with analyses of the undeciphered Indus script.

There are a handful of possible loanwords from the language of the Indus Valley civilization. Sumerian Meluhha may be derived from a native term for the Indus Valley civilization, also reflected in Sanskrit mleccha  meaning non-Vedic or native, and Witzel (2000) further suggests that Sumerian  GIŠšimmar (a type of tree) may be cognate to Rigvedic śimbala and śalmali (also names of trees).

Identification
There are a number of hypotheses as to the nature of this unknown language:
One hypothesis places it within or near the Dravidian languages, perhaps identical with Proto-Dravidian itself. Proposed by Henry Heras in the 1950s, the hypothesis has gained some plausibility and is endorsed by Kamil Zvelebil, Asko Parpola and Iravatham Mahadevan.
 a "lost phylum", i.e. a language with no living continuants (or perhaps a last living reflex in the moribund Nihali language). In this case, the only trace left by the language of the Indus Valley civilization would be historical substratum influence, in particular the substratum in Vedic Sanskrit.

Hypotheses that have gained less mainstream academic acceptance include:
 an Indo-European language, close or identical to Proto-Indo-Iranian: suggested by archaeologist Shikaripura Ranganatha Rao.
 a Semitic language: Malati Shendge (1997) identified the Harappan culture with an "Asura" empire, and these Asura further with the Assyrians.

Multiple languages 
The Indus script only indicates that it was used to write one language (if any). But it is quite possible that multiple languages were spoken in the IVC, similar to how Sumerian and Akkadian co-existed in Mesopotamia for centuries. Jane R. McIntosh suggests one such possibility: Para-Munda was originally the main language of the civilization, especially in the Punjab region. Later, the proto-Dravidian immigrants introduced their language to the area in the 5th millennium BC. The Dravidian language was spoken by the new settlers in the southern plains, while Para-Munda remained the main language of those in Punjab.

Other theories 
Michael Witzel suggested as an alternative, that an underlying, prefixing language similar to Austroasiatic, notably Khasi; he called it "para-Munda" (i.e. a language related to the Munda subgroup or other Austroasiatic languages, but not strictly descended from the last common predecessor of the contemporary Munda family). Witzel argued that the Rigveda showed signs of this hypothetical Harappan influence in the earliest historic level, and Dravidian only in later levels, suggesting that speakers of Austroasiatic were the original inhabitants of Punjab and that the Indo-Aryans encountered Dravidian speakers only in later times.
The theory was since further supported by Franklin Southworth.

As of 2019, Witzel prefers to leave the question of the original Indian language(s) open until better reconstructions for Dravidian and Munda substrate components in Indo-Aryan languages have been done.

See also 
 Elamo-Dravidian languages
 Indus–Mesopotamia relations
 Megalithic graffiti symbols

Footnotes

References

Further reading

Extinct languages of Asia
Language
Unclassified languages of Asia
Unattested languages of Asia
Pre-Indo-Europeans
Linguistic history of India
Linguistic history of Pakistan